This is a complete list of fellows of the Royal Society elected in 1915. There were no foreign members elected.

Fellows 

Sir Frederick William Andrewes
Arthur William Conway
Leonard Doncaster
John Evershed
Sir Walter Morley Fletcher
Arthur George Green
Sir Henry Hubert Hayden
Sir James Mackenzie
Arthur Thomas Masterman
Sir John Cunningham McLennan
Sir Gilbert Thomas Morgan
Charles Samuel Myers
Sir George Clarke Simpson
Alan Archibald Campbell Swinton
Sir Arthur George Tansley

1915
1915 in the United Kingdom
1915 in science